José Antonio Estrada González (born January 22, 1967) is a Cuban baseball player and Olympic gold medalist.

González is a two time Gold medalist for baseball, winning at the 1992 Summer Olympics and the 1996 Summer Olympics.

References 
 

1967 births
Living people
Olympic baseball players of Cuba
Olympic gold medalists for Cuba
Olympic medalists in baseball
Medalists at the 1992 Summer Olympics
Medalists at the 1996 Summer Olympics
Baseball players at the 1992 Summer Olympics
Baseball players at the 1996 Summer Olympics
Pan American Games gold medalists for Cuba
Baseball players at the 1995 Pan American Games
Pan American Games medalists in baseball
Medalists at the 1995 Pan American Games